Donald David "Donnie" von Geisler III (born October 6, 1978) is a retired Filipino taekwondo athlete of German-American descent, who represented the Philippines in the Summer Olympic Games in the years 2000 and 2004. He is a 1998 Asian Games and World Cup Taekwondo Silver medalist, and won a gold medal for the men's lightweight division at the 2005 Southeast Asian Games held in Pasay, Philippines before his retirement.

Geisler is an AB Communication Arts graduate from the University of Santo Tomas.

Early life
Donald David Geisler III was born in Clark Air Base, Angeles City, Pampanga to Donald David Geisler Jr. and Gracia Cantor Bayonito. His father was a U.S. Army colonel. Donnie is the third of the five children.

Donnie started playing taekwondo at the age of seven. He was trained by a Korean trainer at his school during his elementary where he developed his skills for the sport.

Personal life
He has a son named Robbie. Donnie and Robbie's mother were both college students when their son was born. They were not ready to get married because they just met only for a few months before. They decided to hold off wedding plans until they were sure marriage was the right step for both of them. It was a mature mutual decision. Years later, the two broke up. He is the older brother of actor Baron Geisler. The two of them joined a reality show Pinoy Big Brother in its celebrity edition.

Donnie met Jen Da Silva inside the Big Brother house and they eventually got married. They now have a daughter named Frankie.

Career highlights

Gold Medal at the 23rd Southeast Asian Games. (2005)
Gold Medal at the 22nd Southeast Asian Games. (2003)
Bronze Medal at the 15th Asian Taekwondo Championships. (2002)
Silver Medal at the 21st Southeast Asian Games. (2001)
Silver Medal at the 14th Asian Taekwondo Championships. (2000)
Gold Medal at the 20th Southeast Asian Games. (1999)
Silver Medal at the Bangkok Asian Games. (1998)
Silver Medal at the World Cup Taekwondo. (1998)
Bronze Medal at the 1st World Taekwondo Junior Championships. (1996)

References

External links
 
 official and approved fans club
 Donald Geisler: The child in him
 Geisler wins in taekwondo
 It's time to strike in the Games ? Geisler
 RP team saves best for last in Athens

Pinoy Big Brother contestants
Star Magic
Filipino male taekwondo practitioners
University of Santo Tomas alumni
Taekwondo practitioners at the 2000 Summer Olympics
Taekwondo practitioners at the 2004 Summer Olympics
Olympic taekwondo practitioners of the Philippines
University Athletic Association of the Philippines players
Bicolano people
1981 births
Living people
Filipino people of German descent
Kapampangan people
Asian Games medalists in taekwondo
Sportspeople from Angeles City
Taekwondo practitioners at the 1998 Asian Games
Taekwondo practitioners at the 2002 Asian Games
Taekwondo practitioners at the 2006 Asian Games
Medalists at the 1998 Asian Games
Asian Games silver medalists for the Philippines
Southeast Asian Games gold medalists for the Philippines
Southeast Asian Games medalists in taekwondo
Competitors at the 1999 Southeast Asian Games
Competitors at the 2001 Southeast Asian Games
Competitors at the 2003 Southeast Asian Games
Competitors at the 2005 Southeast Asian Games
Asian Taekwondo Championships medalists
21st-century Filipino people